Eugene Yuanzhi Wu is a Chinese-American lawyer and politician who is a Democratic member of the Texas House of Representatives, serving since 2013.  He was formerly a prosecutor for Harris County.

Early life and education 
Wu was born in Guangzhou in Guangdong province, China. Shortly after, his family immigrated to the United States, and spent time in Odessa, Texas before moving to Sharpstown, a working-class neighborhood in Southwest Houston.  He attended Ed White Elementary, Fondren Middle School, and St. Thomas Episcopal School.

Wu received his Bachelor of Science from Texas A&M University, a master's degree from the LBJ School for Public Affairs at the University of Texas at Austin in Austin, and earned a J.D. degree from the South Texas College of Law in Houston.

Texas House of Representatives 
Wu was elected to the Texas House of Representatives in 2012. His time as a State Representative has been focused on issues concerning education, criminal justice, public safety and child welfare. He is currently a member of the Juvenile Justice and Family Issues Committee, as well as the House Committee on Appropriations. Following his first legislative session he received the Sierra Club's New Leadership in Environmental Protection Award, and was also named Freshman of the Year by the Texas District and County Attorneys Association.

Personal life 
Wu is married to Miya Shay (a reporter for ABC 13 in Houston, Texas) and has two children, Winston and Lyndon Wu.

He has served as a tutor for at-risk youths in the Grad-Lab and Twilight programs at Sharpstown High School and as a mentor for adults with the nonprofit, Skills 4 Living. Wu has been a volunteer and trainer for Neighborhood Centers Inc. In that capacity, he conducts monthly workshops where he has helped several thousand Harris County residents become United States citizens.

See also
 History of Chinese Americans in Houston

References

External links
 
Legislative page

1978 births
Living people
21st-century American politicians
American politicians of Chinese descent
Asian-American people in Texas politics
Democratic Party members of the Texas House of Representatives
Lyndon B. Johnson School of Public Affairs alumni
People from Odessa, Texas
Politicians from Houston
South Texas College of Law alumni
Texas A&M University alumni
Texas lawyers